Carsten Thomas Ball (born 20 June 1987) is an American-Australian retired professional tennis player. Although born and based in the United States, Carsten has represented Australia on tour.

Tennis career

Carsten Ball was born in Newport Beach, California. His father, Syd Ball, was also a tour tennis player. As a junior tennis player he reached a career high of number 9 in the world. He continues to be based in Newport Beach, with his father as his coach.

Ball has five Futures titles to his credit. His best singles results previously consisted of three runner up appearances in American Challengers in 2008 and 2009. In August 2009, Ball reached the final of the LA Tennis Open. He lost to sixth-seeded Sam Querrey. Later in August he qualified for the US Open, where he reached the second round, losing to Novak Djokovic in straight sets.

Ball enjoyed considerable success as a doubles player, often partnering with fellow Australian Chris Guccione. Ball and Guccione won back-to-back doubles titles in the 2011 Sacramento Challenger and Tiburon ATP Challenger Tour events, both $100,000 tournaments. He is now serving as the coach of American tennis player Tennys Sandgren.

ATP career finals

Singles: 1 (0–1)

Doubles: 1 (1–0)

Performance timelines

Singles 
Current as far as the 2012 US Open (tennis).

Doubles
Current as far as the 2012 US Open (tennis).

References

External links
 
 
 
 

1987 births
Living people
American people of Australian descent
Australian male tennis players
Australian people of American descent
Sportspeople from Newport Beach, California
Tennis people from California